Salvia forsskaolei is a herbaceous perennial plant endemic to the southeastern Balkan peninsula, ranging from Bulgaria and Greece to the Black Sea coastline of Turkey. It grows up to 6,000 ft elevation in broad-leaved and coniferous forests, meadows, and on steep banks. It was named after Finnish explorer and naturalist Peter Forsskål, a student of Carl Linnaeus who collected plants in southwest Arabia in the 18th century.

The plant grows into large basal clumps 2 ft tall and wide, with hairy leaves that are parsley-green in spring, turning dark green in summer. The flower whorls are few and widely spaced, with the flower a showy two-lipped violet-blue color that has white streaks with yellow markings on the lower lip.

Notes

forsskaolii
Flora of Bulgaria
Flora of Greece
Flora of Turkey